= American Immigration Policy: A Reappraisal =

1950 book

- Title page for American Immigration Policy: A Reappraisal (1950)
- Author: William S. Bernard, Carolyn Zeleny, Henry Miller
- Publisher: Harper & Bros
- Publication date: 1950

American Immigration Policy: A Reappraisal is a 1950 book edited by William S. Bernard, Carolyn Zeleny, and Henry Miller. It was published by Harper & Bros under the sponsorship of the National Committee on Immigration Policy. The book was the subject of reviews in several academic journals.
